Potamolepidae is a family of freshwater sponges, with seven genera:

Description 
This family contains freshwater sponges with a variety of body shapes, ranging from encrusting, massive to arborescent with irregular lobes, ridges or branches. They are smooth and range in consistency from rigid to hard and stone-like. Gemmules are located at the sponge base or strictly adhering to the substrate.

When present, the ectosomal skeleton has microscleres in the dermal membrane. These take the form of slender oxeas (have pointed ends).

The choanosomal skeleton is alveolate-reticulate. It is loose and irregular at the sponge base and notably dense at the surface and more. Spongin is very sparse. The megascleres are strongyles (have rounded ends), varying from smooth to granular or spiny with inflated ends.

Distribution 
Tropical areas off Africa, South America and around New Caledonia and Fiji.

Genera 
The following genera are recognised:
 Cherokeesia Copeland, Manconi & Pronzato, 2015
 Echinospongilla Manconi & Pronzato, 2002
 Oncosclera Volkmer-Ribeiro, 1970
 Potamolepis Marshall, 1883
 Potamophloios Brien, 1970
 Sterrastrolepis Volkmer-Ribeiro & De Rosa Barbosa, 1978
 Uruguaya Carter, 1881

References

Demospongiae
Sponge families